Levinhurst is an independent music band formed by British musician Lol Tolhurst, a founding member of The Cure, and his wife Cindy Levinson. Levinson provides vocals while Tolhurst writes the majority of the tracks, musically and lyrically, and programmes the drums and keyboards. To date, Levinhurst have released three studio albums - Perfect Life (2004); House by the Sea (2007); and Blue Star (2009) - and two extended plays - The Grey (2006) and Somewhere, Nothing Is Everything (2014). The Grey includes a cover of The Cure song "All Cats Are Grey", a song for which Tolhurst claims to have written the lyrics.

History
The band was formed in the early 2000s by Lol Tolhurst, a founding member of The Cure and his wife Cindy Levinson. Their debut album, Perfect Life, was released in March 2004. This was followed in October 2006 by an EP called The Grey. Their second album, House by the Sea, was released in April 2007.

The band's third album, Blue Star was released in 2009. It features Tolhurst and Levinson, plus other musicians including Michael Dempsey, the original bassist with The Cure. An international tour took place in 2010, promoting Blue Star.

Members

Current members 
Cindy Levinson - vocals (2002–present)
Lol Tolhurst - drums, synthesizer, keyboards (2002–present)
Eric Bradley - guitar, bass, backing vocals (2007–present)
Michael Dempsey - bass, keyboards, guitar, string arrangements (2009–present)

Former members
Dayton Borders - guitar, keyboards (2002–2005)

Discography

Albums
Perfect Life (2004)
House by the Sea (2007)
Blue Star (2009)

EPs
The Grey (2006)
Somewhere, Nothing Is Everything (2014)

References

External links
Levinhurst on Myspace
 
 
Interview with Tolhurst at freewilliamsburg.com
Interview with Tolhurst at chaoscontrol.com

Techno music groups
British indie rock groups